Thalassotalea sediminis is a Gram-negative, rod-shaped and facultatively anaerobic bacterium from the genus of Thalassotalea which has been isolated from sediments from the coast of Weihai in China.

References

Alteromonadales
Bacteria described in 2017